Core Services are a set of macOS and iOS application programming interfaces that architecturally are underneath Carbon, Cocoa and Cocoa Touch. In addition to Core Foundation, it also encompasses other APIs including Grand Central Dispatch, Blocks, CFNetwork, CarbonCore, OSServices, and WebServicesCore.

References

macOS APIs